Srijit Mukherji is an  Indian film director and screenwriter who predominantly works in Bengali cinema. 
His regular collaboration with veteran actor Prosenjit Chatterjee brought him into the limelight. His first feature film Autograph (2010), was a critical and commercial success, where he had written the script with Chatterjee in mind. His fifth film, Jaatishwar, won four national awards at India's 61st National Film Awards (2014). He won the National Film Award for Best Direction and Best Original Screenplay for his sixth film, Chotushkone, at India's 62nd National Film Awards. His eighth film, Rajkahini had been remade into a Hindi film titled, Begum Jaan, starring Vidya Balan in 2017. His 2018 release Ek Je Chhilo Raja won the 'Best Bengali Film' Award at India's 66th National Film Awards. His 2019 film Gumnaami won him the Best Bengali Film and Best Adapted Screenplay Awards at the 67th National Film Awards

Early life
Mukherji completed his schooling from Dolna Day School, Kolkata and South Point High School, Kolkata, before studying economics at Presidency College, Kolkata. He went on to complete his MA and M.Phil in environmental economics at Jawaharlal Nehru University, parallelly working as a social scientist in the Urban Transport and Pollution Sector with TERI in New Delhi. He quit his Ph.D while in his first year, to join IRI Symphony, Bangalore as an econometrician and business analyst. After working in Bangalore and a brief stint in Milan, he quit his job to actively pursue theatre and films.

Career
Even while working as an economist and statistician, he was actively involved with the English professional theatre circuit in Delhi and Bangalore. He has acted in Madness, adapted from Paulo Coelho's Veronica Decides To Die; Manoj Mitra's The Orchard of Banchharam; Badal Sircar's The Other Side of History; Sunil Ganguly's Pratidwandi – The Adversary, adapted for the stage from Satyajit Ray's film of the same name and Lucknow 76. He wrote and directed Mindgame, an Indian adaptation of Reginald Rose's Twelve Angry Men, at the Alliance Francaise De Bangalore in 2006. In April 2008, he formed his own troupe, Pandora's Act, whose first production, Feluda Pherot! at Rangashankara in July 2008 was a runaway success and was the first ever non-canonical dramatisation of Satyajit Ray's sleuth Feluda. Barun Chanda, Ray's leading man in Seemabodhho, and Parambrata Chatterjee, the screen Topshe and film youth icon, starred in this production. In 2009, he wrote, directed and acted in the English play Checkmate, a non-canonical re-interpretation of Byomkesh Bakshi, Saradindu Bandopadhyay's sleuth. He was an assistant director, lyricist and actor in both Anjan Dutt's Madly Bangalee and Aparna Sen's Iti Mrinalini, in 2009. He has also written lyrics for films like Cross Connection, Le Chakka and Josh, TV serials like Coffee and More and Dadagiri and non-film albums of Usha Uthup.

2010–2012 
In 2010 Mukherji directed his debut feature film, the award-winning blockbuster – Autograph which was both critically acclaimed and commercially successful. The film won 41 awards and was an official selection at Abu Dhabi International Film Festival 2010, MIAAC Film Festival in New York 2010, Glasgow International Film Festival 2011 and London Indian Film Festival 2011.

In the same year he also made his acting debut on Bengali television in the Rituparno Ghosh scripted mega serial Gaaner Opare, produced by Ideas Entertainment.

His work in 2011 included a major role in Anindya Banerjee's Chaplin starring Rudranil Ghosh and his second film, Baishe Srabon starring Prosenjit Chatterjee, Parambrata Chatterjee, Raima Sen, Abir Chatterjee and Gautam Ghose, who returned to acting after a hiatus of 29 years. Baishe Srabon was recently the official selection at the Dubai International Film Festival and the closing film at the London Indian Film Festival, and had a 105-day run at the box office making it the biggest blockbuster of the year. Baishe Srabon has won 41 awards. His third feature film was Hemlock Society, a romantic satire set at the backdrop of a school which teaches aspirants how to successfully commit suicide. It featured Parambrata Chatterjee and Koel Mallick and won 21 awards.

2013–2016 
Mukherji's fourth film, Mishawr Rawhoshyo, based on Kakababu with Prasenjit Chattopadhyay playing the lead character has been declared as one of the biggest blockbusters ever and the highest earning urban mainstream film. He has acted in films like Dutta Vs Dutta, Bapi Bari Jaa and the national award-winning Shobdo. His fifth film Jaatishwar is generally considered to be the best in his career and most critically acclaimed. It is the musical bridge between two centuries of Bengali culture and a biopic cum a musical cum a reincarnation drama. At the 61st National Awards 2014, the highest film honour in India, it won 4 national awards for Music Direction, Playback Singing, Costume and Make up. This was the highest tally for a film in India this year, and the second highest ever for a Bengali film. It also swept the Mirchi Music Awards in 2015 winning 7 awards. The following year at the 62nd National Awards 2015, Chotushkone won him the Best Director and Best Original Screenplay awards, along with winning the Best Cinematography.

He also received the Young Achiever Award from Rotary International, the prestigious Shera Bangali Award from ABP Anando and the Shoilojanando Mukhopadhyay Memorial Award in 2012 for his contribution in the field of film direction. In 2013 he received the Uttam Kumar Memorial Award from the Government of West Bengal becoming the youngest director to achieve this. He has also received the oldest film award in India, the BFJA award, for remarkable contribution to Bengali Cinema in the last few years.

2017–2020 
Mukherji has made his directorial debut in Bollywood with the film Begum Jaan which is a remake of his earlier Bengali film Rajkahini. Vidya Balan plays the lead role of a brothel's madam during the partition of India in 1947.
He had two releases in 2018, Uma and Ek Je Chhilo Raja. Both were box office superhits. The former went to 10 film festivals around the world and won 6 awards while the latter won 23 awards and went to 7 film festivals around the world including Palm Springs International Film Festival.
In 2018, it was reported that Mukherji will be directing a Junglee Pictures produced yet to be titled web-series in Hindi, based on the novel of noted novelist and blogger Arnab Ray, The Mahabharata Murders. This will be his first foray into web-series direction.
In 2019, he has three releases Shahjahan Regency, Vinci Da and Gumnaami, the last two being both critical and commercial successes along with being a festival favourite. Gumnaami won the Best Bengali Feature Film and Best Adapted Screenplay Awards at the 67th National Film Awards.

He has also completed another web-series, Feluda Pherot, which is based on two Feluda stories written by Satyajit Ray, Chhinomostar Obhishaap and Darjeeling Jomjomat.

Influence
Mukherji influenced by Most Popular Bengali Filmmakers like Satyajit Ray, Rituparno Ghosh, Tapan Sinha, Mrinal Sen, Anjan Dutt, Bollywood Filmmakers like Shyam Benegal, Anurag Kashyap & western filmmakers like Christopher Nolan, David Fincher

Filmography

As director

Web series

As lyricist and actor 

Also as an actor in majority of the films he has directed

Personal life
Mukherji married Rafiath Rashid Mithila on 6 December 2019.

References

External links

Living people
Male actors from Kolkata
1977 births
University of Calcutta alumni
Jawaharlal Nehru University alumni
Bengali film directors
21st-century Indian male actors
21st-century Indian film directors
Bengali screenwriters
Screenwriters from Kolkata
Bengali male actors
21st-century Indian dramatists and playwrights
Best Director National Film Award winners
Film directors from Kolkata
Best Original Screenplay National Film Award winners
21st-century Indian screenwriters